The Morrison Avenue–Soundview station is a local station on the IRT Pelham Line of the New York City Subway. It is served by the 6 train at all times and is located at Morrison Avenue and Westchester Avenue in the Soundview neighborhood of the Bronx.

History
The station opened on May 30, 1920 as Sound View Avenue and has also been known as Morrison Avenue–Sound View Avenue and Morrison–Sound View Avenues. The station was opened as the Pelham Line was extended to East 177th Street from Hunts Point Avenue. The construction of the Pelham Line was part of the Dual Contracts, signed on March 19, 1913 and also known as the Dual Subway System. The Pelham Line was built as a branch of the Lexington Avenue Line running northeast via 138th Street, Southern Boulevard and Westchester Avenue. Initially, the extension was served by a shuttle service operating with elevated cars. Passengers transferred to the shuttle at Hunts Point Avenue.

In 1981, the Metropolitan Transportation Authority listed the station among the 69 most deteriorated stations in the subway system.

Station layout

This elevated station has three tracks and two side platforms. The center track is used by the <6> train on weekdays in the peak direction. The platforms have beige windscreen, green canopies, and red roofs in the center and waist-level black steel fence at both ends.

Exits
Two staircases from each platform lead to the wooden elevated mezzanine beneath the tracks. The station house has a turnstile bank, token booth, and three street staircases to all four corners of Morrison and Westchester Avenues except for the southeast one.

References

External links 

 
 The Subway Nut — Morrison–Soundview Avenues Pictures
 Morrison Avenue entrance from Google Maps Street View
 Platforms from Google Maps Street View

IRT Pelham Line stations
New York City Subway stations in the Bronx
Railway stations in the United States opened in 1920
1920 establishments in New York City
Soundview, Bronx